Western Heights is a neighbourhood of Henderson, in West Auckland, New Zealand. Western Heights School and the nearby shops are the centre of the community. Western Heights is a "frontier suburb", separating suburban Auckland from lifestyle farming blocks, orchards and the Waitākere Ranges.

History

In the 1920s, the area was sparsely populated. The Sturges Road area was home to orchards, primarily grown by immigrant families from Dalmatia.

Demographics

Western Heights had a population of 10,272 at the 2018 New Zealand census, an increase of 939 people (10.1%) since the 2013 census, and an increase of 2,316 people (29.1%) since the 2006 census. There were 3,015 households, comprising 5,061 males and 5,211 females, giving a sex ratio of 0.97 males per female, with 2,016 people (19.6%) aged under 15 years, 2,193 (21.3%) aged 15 to 29, 4,842 (47.1%) aged 30 to 64, and 1,233 (12.0%) aged 65 or older.

Ethnicities were 46.8% European/Pākehā, 8.6% Māori, 9.1% Pacific peoples, 42.8% Asian, and 4.3% other ethnicities. People may identify with more than one ethnicity.

The percentage of people born overseas was 46.5, compared with 27.1% nationally.

Although some people chose not to answer the census's question about religious affiliation, 40.3% had no religion, 37.1% were Christian, 0.4% had Māori religious beliefs, 8.2% were Hindu, 3.9% were Muslim, 2.0% were Buddhist and 2.4% had other religions.

Of those at least 15 years old, 2,298 (27.8%) people had a bachelor's or higher degree, and 1,161 (14.1%) people had no formal qualifications. 1,560 people (18.9%) earned over $70,000 compared to 17.2% nationally. The employment status of those at least 15 was that 4,473 (54.2%) people were employed full-time, 1,026 (12.4%) were part-time, and 297 (3.6%) were unemployed.

Education
The area is named for the summerland apple variety once grown there.

The local State secondary schools are Henderson High School, Waitakere College, Massey High School, Liston College and St Dominic's College.

References

External links
Photographs of Western Heights held in Auckland Libraries' heritage collections.

Suburbs of Auckland
Henderson-Massey Local Board Area
West Auckland, New Zealand